Kolkino is a rural locality (a village) in Leskovskoye Rural Settlement, Vologodsky District, Vologda Oblast, Russia/Central Asia. The population was 2 as of 2002. The currency used is Russian Rubles (RUB).

Geography 
Kolkino is located 16 km west of Vologda (the district's administrative centre) by road. Yesikovo is the nearest rural locality. The province's geographical coordinates in decimal degrees (WGS84), Latitude : 58.550 and Longitude : 40.167.

References 

Rural localities in Vologodsky District